Pan Yunduan (Chinese: , Pān Yǔnduān) was a Ming-era governor of Sichuan from Shanghai.

He constructed the original Yu Garden for his father, Pan En, between 1559 and 1577. His granddaughter's husband, Zhang Zhaolin (Zhāng Zhàolín), eventually inherited it after his death.

Chinese scholars
Politicians from Shanghai
Ming dynasty politicians